Hamburger SV (HSV) is a German professional football team based in Hamburg, football is the largest department of a multi-sport club. The club played football since it was named HSV in 1919, after a merger of three clubs. The HSV was invited to join the Bundesliga for the first season in 1963.

Famous players as Franz Beckenbauer played for the club, but he had only 28 appearances. Uwe Seeler made 239 appearances and shot 137 goals during his career for the HSV. Seeler also played 72 times for the Germany national team and won the German Footballer of the Year award three times. Manfred Kaltz had the most appearances for Hamburg with 581 matches during his 20 years long career.

Players  

This list includes players with 50 or more appearances. Current players are in bold.

Position key:
GK – Goalkeeper;
DF – Defender;
MF – Midfielder;
FW – Forward

Club captains

{|
|- valign="top"
|
{| class="wikitable alternance"
|-
!|Name
!|Period
|-
| Nico-Jan Hoogma || 2001–2004
|-
| Tomáš Ujfaluši || 2004
|-
| Daniel Van Buyten || 2004–2006
|-
| Rafael van der Vaart || 2006–2008
|-
| David Jarolím || 2008–2010
|-
| Heiko Westermann || 2010–2013
|-
| Rafael van der Vaart || 2013–2015
|-
| Johan Djourou || 2015–2017
|-
| Gotoku Sakai || 2017–2019

References

 
Lists of association football players by club in Germany
Hamburg-related lists
Association football player non-biographical articles